Mapaseka Makhanya (born 9 April 1985) is a South African middle- and long-distance runner who specializes in the marathon race, formerly in the 800 and 1500 metres.

In global events, she competed at the 2001 World Youth Championships and the 2004 World Junior Championships without reaching the final, and placed lowly at the 2011 and 2013 World Cross Country Championships (83rd and 86th). She finished eleventh in the 1500 metres at the 2007 All-Africa Games and sixth in the 800 metres at the 2010 African Championships. She also competed at the 2007 Summer Universiade without reaching the final.

Makhanya shifted to road races from 2013 on, making her marathon debut in Johannesburg the same year. In 2015, she finished third at the Hannover Marathon in a time of 2:31:02 hours.

Her personal best times are 2:03.36 minutes in the 800 metres (2010); 4:08.18 minutes in the 1500 metres (2010); 9:08.87 minutes in the 3000 metres (2013); 10:58.20 minutes in the 3000 metres steeplechase (2004); 15:53.61 minutes in the 5000 metres (2013); 1:12:43 hours in the half marathon (2017); and 2:31:02 hours in the marathon (2015).

In 2013 she became South African Sportswoman of the Year.

References

External links

1985 births
Living people
South African female middle-distance runners
South African female long-distance runners
South African female marathon runners
South African female steeplechase runners
Athletes (track and field) at the 2007 All-Africa Games
African Games competitors for South Africa